Hospital Vicente D'Antoni is a hospital in La Ceiba, Honduras established on February 4, 1924 in a formal ceremony conducted by the nation's President. It is one of the best hospitals in the republic and was greatly assisted for a number of years by the arrival of two nurses from New England from Sisters of Mercy, who opened up a nursing school at the hospital.

History
Hospital Vincente D'Antoni was built on February 4, 1924 named in memory after Sr. Vincent D'Antoni, a general manager of the Vaccaro Bros. Co., which provided funds for its construction that totaled $200,000. It was originally built to treat charity patients.

References

External links
Hospital y Clinicas Vicente D'Antoni (official)

Hospitals in Honduras